Sennan may refer to:
Sennan, Osaka, city near Osaka, Japan
Sennan, Halmstad, locality in Halmstad Municipality, Sweden